UFO 1 is the debut studio album by British rock band UFO. It was first released in the UK by Beacon Records in October 1970. The first US release was on Rare Earth Records in April 1971. Neither of these releases charted, but the album did become a success in Germany and Japan.

The album was reissued under the name Unidentified Flying Object with 4 of the 5 tracks from the band's second album. This reissue shows a photo of the band from the 1980s on the cover.

The album was also reissued on the Flying, The Early Years compilation, along with all of the band's other work from before guitarist Michael Schenker joined the group. It was also given a straight reissue under the name All The Hits & More - The Early Days (XXX Media, Germany, 2011), with no additional tracks.

Track listing

 "Unidentified Flying Object" is an instrumental.
 The title "Boogie for George" was shortened in "Boogie" on the CD reissue (1994, Repertoire Records).

Personnel
UFO
 Phil Mogg – vocals
 Mick Bolton – guitar
 Pete Way – bass
 Andy Parker – drums

Production
Guy Fletcher, Doug Flett – producers
Milton Samuel – executive producer

References

External links
 

UFO (band) albums
1970 debut albums
Beacon Records albums
Albums produced by Guy Fletcher (songwriter)
Space rock albums
Decca Records albums
Stateside Records albums